2022 MNL statistics here

Matches
Fixtures and results of the Myanmar National League 2023 season.

Week 1

Week 2

Week 3

Week 4

Week 5

Week 6

Week 7

Week 8

Week 9

Week 10

Week 11

Week 12

Week 13

Week 14

Week 15

Week 16

Week 17

Week 18

Week 19

Week 20

Week 21

Week 22

Season statistics

Top scorers
As of 17 March 2023.

Most assists
As of 17 March 2023.

Clean sheets
As of March 13, 2023.

Hat-tricks

References

Myanmar sport-related lists
Myanmar National League